The  2012–13 VHL season was the third season of the Russian Major League. It started 9 September 2012 and ended in April 2013.

Team and KHL affiliation changes

Team changes
Donbass Donetsk left the league after its inaugural season joining the KHL.
Buran Voronezh and THK Tver of the lower level Russian Hockey League joined.
The league was expanded with two more non-Russian teams, Belarusian Yunost Minsk and Kazakhstani Saryarka Karaganda.
A new franchise Kuban Krasnodar was created.
HC VMF relocated from St. Petersburg to Kondopoga, Karelia.

Affiliation changes

Regular season
Starting with this season the VHL abandoned its previous conference structure. All teams played their regular seasons in a round robin format with two games (home and away) against every team of the league.

League standings

Source: vhl.khl.ru

Points are awarded as follows:
3 Points for a win in regulation ("W")
2 Points for a win in overtime ("OTW") or penalty shootout ("SOW")
1 Point for a loss in a penalty shootout ("SOL") or overtime ("OTL")
0 Points for a loss in regulation ("L")

Bratina Cup Playoffs

References

2012–13 in Russian ice hockey leagues
Rus
Russian Major League seasons